Pappireddippatti is a state assembly constituency in Tamil Nadu, India, that was formed after constituency delimitation in 2007. Its State Assembly Constituency number is 60. Located in Dharmapuri district, it comprises portions of the Dharmapuri and Pappireddipatti taluks. It is included in the Dharmapuri parliamentary constituency for elections to the Parliament of India. It is one of the 234 State Legislative Assembly Constituencies in Tamil Nadu, in India.

Members of the Legislative Assembly

Election Results

2021

2019 By-election

2016

2011

References

Assembly constituencies of Tamil Nadu
Dharmapuri district